The Jaz Life is an album by the American jazz trumpeter Malachi Thompson, recorded in 1991 and released by the Delmark label the following year. "Mystic Trumpet Man" is a tribute to Miles Davis.

Reception

The Chicago Tribune called the album "spirited and bluesy," writing that Thompson "is a real talent."

AllMusic reviewer Michael G. Nastos stated: "these six compositions are not only life-affirming, but acknowledgments to such important icons as John Coltrane, Art Blakey, Miles Davis, and some of their important sidemen, who have inspired Thompson during his struggle with a rare lymphomatic cancer ... Thompson really hits the note consistently with this band of modern mainstream jazz masters performing at their best. Recommended."

Track listing
All compositions by Malachi Thompson except where noted
 "In Walked John" – 7:08
 "My Romance" (Richard Rodgers, Lorenz Hart) – 9:23	
 "Drown in My Own Tears" (Henry Glover) – 7:27
 "Mystic Trumpet Man" – 5:49
 "Croquet Ballet" (Billy Harper) – 6:39
 "Lucky Seven" – 12:07

Personnel
Malachi Thompson – trumpet 
Joe Ford – alto saxophone, soprano saxophone
Carter Jefferson – tenor saxophone
Kirk Brown – piano 
Harrison Bankhead – bass
Nasar Abadey – drums 
Richard Lawrence – congas

References

Malachi Thompson albums
1992 albums
Delmark Records albums
Albums produced by Bob Koester